Bernard-Augustin Conroy (April 23, 1882 – January 26, 1949) was a Canadian physician and politician.

Born in Montreal, Quebec, Conroy was educated at the Sarsfield School, Loyola College and McGill University. He became a physician in 1906 and was employed by the Canada Steamship Lines. He was elected to the Legislative Assembly of Quebec for the riding of Montréal–Sainte-Anne in 1919. A Liberal, he did not run in 1923.

From 1922 to 1949, he was the Chief of Medicine for the Montreal Police.

References

1882 births
1949 deaths
Loyola College (Montreal) alumni
McGill University alumni
Quebec Liberal Party MNAs
Physicians from Montreal
Politicians from Montreal
Service de police de la Ville de Montréal